Thomas James Mace-Archer-Mills (born Thomas James Muscatello August 18, 1979) is an American commentator on the British royal family. In 2012 he founded the British Monarchists Society, an organization that supports the monarchy of the United Kingdom.

He was interviewed as a supporter of the British monarchy in both domestic and international media including BBC Radio, The Economist, Voice of America, Europe 1, SRG SSR, Comedy Central and NTV Russia. During the wedding of The Duke and Duchess of Sussex, he provided commentary for the French news channel BFM TV.

On May 31, 2018, the Wall Street Journal conducted a background investigation into Mace-Archer-Mills, resulting in an article containing accusations that he was a charlatan.

Background
Mace-Archer-Mills was born in Glens Falls, New York, and grew up in Bolton Landing, New York. His father, Thomas Sr. is of Italian descent. In his youth, he gained an interest in British history and had visited the United Kingdom extensively as a teenager.  While at high school, his anglophilia was so strong that he started to use the phrase "God save the Queen" and also attempted to speak in a  British accent. Mace-Archer-Mills began using the accent while he was working on a high school production of the musical Oliver! in which he played  Mr. Sowerberry. He says this voice has now completely replaced his native Upstate New York accent, even when he visits his family back in America.

He studied politics and history at Coastal Carolina University, and after graduating became a real estate agent in New York  State under the auspices of Imperial Group International, where he used the name Thomas J Muscatello-DeLacroix. Later, he moved back to South Carolina into the town of Murrells Inlet as a brokerage owner. He eventually settled in to London in 2012 which he became a property consultant, and founded the British Monarchist Society. In 2018, he stated he was applying for British citizenship. He has written and published two coffee-table books about the British monarchy and cocktails, To the Queen: A Royal Drinkology in 2012 and Their Majesties’ Mixers: A Royal Drinkology in 2017. In 2018, to celebrate the wedding of the Sussexes he got into the world of cryptocurrencies, by launching a royal-themed cryptocurrency call "Crown Royal" which was offered at 500 ROYL to one Ethereum.

British Monarchist Society 
The British Monarchist Society is a self-described non-partisan monarchist organization started by Mace-Archer-Mills in 2012 as a private limited company under guarantee. In 2017, Mace-Archer-Mills and the society were involved in a conference called the Qatar Global Security & Stability Conference, which was set-up by London-based Qatari opposition leader Khalid Al-Hail. The conference in question notably included speakers such as Conservative MP Daniel Kaczynski.  In 2019, the British Monarchist Society was dissolved itself and re-launched the association   Mace-Archer-Mills left as a company director of the society in June 2020, but continued as editor and owner of the society's magazine Crown & Country.

In June 2021 one of the patrons on the society Conservative MP Joy Morrissey together with the society, proposed that a framed picture of the monarch should be in every home, company and institute in the country as part of a Britishness campaign. This proposal which was announced in the same week as the "One Britain One Nation" children’s singing initiative, was swiftly condemned by commentators saying that it was jingoistic and silly. The society later put out a statement on social media saying it was part of an idea for the Queen’s Platinum Jubilee and it was copying a similar scheme in Canada and Australia.

See also
International Monarchist League – The main British monarchist pressure group
Republic - The main British republican organisation

References

External links
Thomas Mace-Archer-Mills personal website, Mr. Monarchy
The British Monarchist Society
Crown & Country Magazine

1979 births
Living people
American expatriates in the United Kingdom
American monarchists
Monarchism in the United Kingdom